The Ipswich Witches are a British speedway club based at Foxhall Stadium near Ipswich, Suffolk.  They compete in the British SGB Premiership. Meetings are staged on most Thursdays from March until October, normally commencing at 7.30pm (first race 7.45pm).

The Witches are currently promoted by former Ipswich riders Chris Louis and Ritchie Hawkins. Chris Louis is the son of former rider and promoter John Louis

History

Early history 
Foxhall Stadium was purpose-built for speedway in 1950, and meetings were held there from 1951 to 1965 when the track was resurfaced for stock car racing. Attendances approached 20,000 and made stars of riders such as Syd Clarke, Junior Bainbridge, Tich Read and Peter Moore. The inaugural league season was the 1952 Speedway Southern League, where the team finished 8th.

After 10 seasons of league speedway the team withdrew from the 1962 Speedway National League mid-season. Their best placing to that date had been a third place finish in 1953. In 1969, John Berry built a new smaller track inside the stock car circuit and re-opened the club with a team which would soon include the promoter John Louis.

1970s
In 1970 and 1971, the Witches won the British League Division Two Knockout Cup, before John Berry applied for membership of the British League in 1972. The Witches went on to become a dominant force in the top flight of British speedway, winning the British League Championship in 1975 and 1976, plus two Knock-Out Cup wins (doing "the double" in 1976). The 1975 title saw Ipswich defeat Belle Vue Aces by a solitary point. John Louis and Billy Sanders scored heavily throughout the season for Ipswich. The following year in 1976, Ipswich won their second consecutive title. The Witches team was once again headed by John Louis and Billy Sanders but this time Tony Davey also scored well with an average of 8.37, resulting in a comfortable league title success for the Suffolk team. The team then went on to claim the double on 28 October by winning the Knockout Cup.

1980s
The team won the double again in 1984 in addition to the 1981 Knockout Cup. During the 1984 double the team had a great season despite losing their leading rider Dennis Sigalos. Australian Sanders remained one of the teams main scorers and he was supported by strong season scoring from American showman John Cook, Finn Kai Niemi and the English international pair of Jeremy Doncaster and Richard Knight. Just three matches into the 1985 season Sanders killed himself on 23 April. The news shocked the club and the wider speedway world.

1990s
Following the death of Ipswich rider Billy Sanders in 1985 and Berry's subsequent decision to quit, the club struggled and almost closed before being saved by a consortium which included former rider John Louis. The new Witches began competing in the National League (second tier) in 1989 and 1990, before joining the amalgamated British League and then, after a further restructuring of speedway in Britain, the Elite League.

In 1998, Ipswich won the Elite League Championship, the Knock-Out Cup and the end of season Craven Shield tournament. In addition, Ipswich riders won the World Championship (Tony Rickardsson), the British Speedway Championship (Chris Louis) and the British Under-21 Championship (Scott Nicholls). The team also included the Polish star Tomasz Gollob, who finished third in the World Championship.

2000s 

The team spent the entire decade in the Elite League finishing third in 2000 and 2004 (the latter resulting in elimination in the play off semi finals). In 2008, they finished fourth and once again were eliminated in the play off semi finals. 

The early part of the decade saw the emergence of Scott Nicholls as their leading rider alongside Louis, with other notable seasons from Mark Loram, Jarosław Hampel and Hans Andersen.

2010s 
In November 2010, the Witches moved down to the Premier League (second tier). In 2011, the Witches finished in third place in the final Premier League table and won the Premier League Four-Team Championship staged at Leicester Lions. During the winter of 2011/12, Director of Speedway Chris Louis brought in Australians Rohan Tungate and Cameron Heeps. In the first meeting of the 2012 season—a challenge match with Rye House at Foxhall—both Taylor Poole (broken left arm) and Morten Risager (damaged lower vertebrae) were ruled out, and Ipswich asset Leigh Lanham re-joined the club as a replacement for Risager. Ipswich reached the League Cup and Knockout Cup finals, finishing runner-up in both competitions.

For 2013, a new number one rider, Ben Barker, was signed. An early exit from the Knockout Cup against Workington Comets was tempered by qualification for the League Cup final after an aggregate victory against the Edinburgh Monarchs. However, after defeating Newcastle Diamonds in the first leg of the League Cup final at Foxhall, the season ended with five consecutive defeats; a 27–65 loss at Newcastle Diamonds surrendered the League Cup. Ipswich were runners-up to the Somerset Rebels, but they failed to defeat Scunthorpe Scorpions or Edinburgh Monarchs in the play-off mini-group.

In 2014, Richie Worrall joined as the new number one, and American Gino Manzares was signed as the other new rider. The Witches finished third in the Premier League and reached the Knockout Cup final. The play-off mini group with Scunthorpe Scorpions and Somerset Rebels ended with two home wins, but no points from away fixtures and the Knockout Cup final was another runners-up medal, as the Witches were dominated both home and away by the Edinburgh Monarchs.

The Witches finished seventh in the Premier League in 2015, fifth in 2016, second in 2017, and seventh in 2018. Shortly before 2019, Ipswich decided to move to the first division, the SGB Premiership.

2020s 
Unfortunately, the 2020 season was cancelled in July 2020 as a result of the restrictions placed on sporting events by COVID-19 rules set by the UK Government. In 2021, the Witches finished 5th in the SGB Premiership. The team finished 2nd in the 2022 season, losing in the play-off semi final.  The Witches won the 2022 Pairs championship.

Season summary

Previous teams

2022 teams

 (C)

 (Rising Star)
 (Number 8)

Also rode:

Juniors:
Premiership Junior League (PJL) - South

Notable riders

References

Bibliography

External links
Ipswich Witches official website
British Speedway official website

Speedway Premier League teams
SGB Championship teams
Sport in Ipswich